In linear algebra, the singular value decomposition (SVD) is a factorization of a real or complex matrix. It generalizes the eigendecomposition of a square normal matrix with an orthonormal eigenbasis to any  matrix. It is related to the polar decomposition.

Such decomposition always exists for any complex matrix. If  is real, then  and  can be guaranteed to be real orthogonal matrices; in such contexts, the SVD is often denoted 

The SVD is not unique. It is always possible to choose the decomposition so that the singular values  are in descending order.

Mathematical applications of the SVD include computing the pseudoinverse, matrix approximation, and determining the rank, range, and null space of a matrix.  The SVD is also extremely useful in all areas of science, engineering, and statistics, such as signal processing, least squares fitting of data, and process control.

Intuitive interpretations

Rotation, coordinate scaling, and reflection 
In the special case when  is an  real square matrix, the matrices  and  can be chosen to be real  matrices too. In that case, "unitary" is the same as "orthogonal". Thus the SVD decomposition breaks down any linear transformation of  into a composition of three geometrical transformations: a rotation or reflection, followed by a coordinate-by-coordinate scaling, followed by another rotation or reflection.

In particular, if  has a positive determinant, then  and  can be chosen to be both rotations with reflections, or both rotations without reflections. If the determinant is negative, exactly one of them will have a reflection. If the determinant is zero, each can be independently chosen to be of either type. 

Singular values as semiaxes of an ellipse or ellipsoid 
As shown in the figure, the singular values can be interpreted as the magnitude of the semiaxes of an ellipse in 2D. This concept can be generalized to -dimensional Euclidean space, with the singular values of any  square matrix being viewed as the magnitude of the semiaxis of an -dimensional ellipsoid. Similarly, the singular values of any  matrix can be viewed as the magnitude of the semiaxis of an -dimensional ellipsoid in -dimensional space, for example as an ellipse in a (tilted) 2D plane in a 3D space. Singular values encode magnitude of the semiaxis, while singular vectors encode direction.  See below for further details.

The matrix  maps the basis vector  to the stretched unit vector . However, when  is not positive-semidefinite and Hermitian but still diagonalizable, its eigendecomposition and singular value decomposition are distinct.

Geometric meaning 

The linear transformation

has a particularly simple description with respect to these orthonormal bases: we have

With respect to these bases, the map  is therefore represented by a diagonal matrix with non-negative real diagonal entries.

Non-zero singular values are simply the lengths of the semi-axes of this ellipsoid. Especially when , and all the singular values are distinct and non-zero, the SVD of the linear map  can be easily analyzed as a succession of three consecutive moves: consider the ellipsoid  and specifically its axes; then consider the directions in  sent by  onto these axes. These directions happen to be mutually orthogonal. To define the third and last move, apply an isometry  to this ellipsoid to obtain .

Example 
Consider the  matrix

A singular value decomposition of this matrix is given by 

The scaling matrix  is zero outside of the diagonal (grey italics) and one diagonal element is zero (red bold, light blue bold in dark mode).

This particular singular value decomposition is not unique.  Choosing  such that

is also a valid singular value decomposition.

SVD and spectral decomposition

Singular values, singular vectors, and their relation to the SVD 

In any singular value decomposition

Consequently, the above theorem implies that:
 An  matrix  has at most  distinct singular values.

A singular value for which we can find two left (or right) singular vectors that are linearly independent is called degenerate. The similar statement is true for right-singular vectors.

Even if all singular values are nonzero, if  then the cokernel is nontrivial, in which case  is padded with  orthogonal vectors from the cokernel. Conversely, if , then  is padded by  orthogonal vectors from the kernel.

Non-degenerate singular values always have unique left- and right-singular vectors, up to multiplication by a unit-phase factor eiφ (for the real case up to a sign).

Relation to eigenvalue decomposition 
The singular value decomposition is very general in the sense that it can be applied to any  matrix, whereas eigenvalue decomposition can only be applied to diagonalizable matrices. Nevertheless, the two decompositions are related.

The right-hand sides of these relations describe the eigenvalue decompositions of the left-hand sides.  Consequently:

In the special case that  is a normal matrix, which by definition must be square, the spectral theorem says that it can be unitarily diagonalized using a basis of eigenvectors, so that it can be written  for a unitary matrix  and a diagonal matrix  with complex elements  along the diagonal. When  is positive semi-definite,  will be non-negative real numbers so that the decomposition  is also a singular value decomposition.

While only non-defective square matrices have an eigenvalue decomposition, any  matrix has a SVD.

Applications of the SVD

Pseudoinverse
The singular value decomposition can be used for computing the pseudoinverse of a matrix. (Various authors use different notation for the pseudoinverse; here we use .) Indeed, the pseudoinverse of the matrix  with singular value decomposition  is

The pseudoinverse is one way to solve linear least squares problems.

Solving homogeneous linear equations
A typical situation is that  is known and a non-zero  is to be determined which satisfies the equation. The vector  can be characterized as a right-singular vector corresponding to a singular value of  that is zero. This observation means that if  is a square matrix and has no vanishing singular value, the equation has no non-zero  as a solution. It also means that if there are several vanishing singular values, any linear combination of the corresponding right-singular vectors is a valid solution.

Total least squares minimization
A total least squares problem seeks the vector  that minimizes the 2-norm of a vector  under the constraint . The solution turns out to be the right-singular vector of  corresponding to the smallest singular value.

Range, null space and rank
Another application of the SVD is that it provides an explicit representation of the range and null space of a matrix .

In numerical linear algebra the singular values can be used to determine the effective rank of a matrix, as rounding error may lead to small but non-zero singular values in a rank deficient matrix. Singular values beyond a significant gap are assumed to be numerically equivalent to zero.

Low-rank matrix approximation
Some practical applications need to solve the problem of approximating a matrix  with another matrix , said to be truncated, which has a specific rank .

 

where  is the same matrix as  except that it contains only the  largest singular values (the other singular values are replaced by zero). This is known as the Eckart–Young theorem, as it was proved by those two authors in 1936 (although it was later found to have been known to earlier authors; see ).

Separable models
The SVD can be thought of as decomposing a matrix into a weighted, ordered sum of separable matrices. By separable, we mean that a matrix  can be written as an outer product of two vectors , or, in coordinates, . Specifically, the matrix  can be decomposed as

 

The SVD can be used to find the decomposition of an image processing filter into separable horizontal and vertical filters. Note that the number of non-zero  is exactly the rank of the matrix.

Separable models often arise in biological systems, and the SVD factorization is useful to analyze such systems. For example, some visual area V1 simple cells' receptive fields can be well described by a Gabor filter in the space domain multiplied by a modulation function in the time domain. Thus, given a linear filter evaluated through, for example, reverse correlation, one can rearrange the two spatial dimensions into one dimension, thus yielding a two-dimensional filter (space, time) which can be decomposed through SVD. One may then define an index of separability

 

which is the fraction of the power in the matrix M which is accounted for by the first separable matrix in the decomposition.

Nearest orthogonal matrix
The solution is the product . This intuitively makes sense because an orthogonal matrix would have the decomposition  where  is the identity matrix, so that if  then the product  amounts to replacing the singular values with ones. Equivalently, the solution is the unitary matrix  of the Polar Decomposition  in either order of stretch and rotation, as described above.

Specifically,

 

where  denotes the Frobenius norm.

This problem is equivalent to finding the nearest orthogonal matrix to a given matrix .

The Kabsch algorithm
The Kabsch algorithm (called Wahba's problem in other fields) uses SVD to compute the optimal rotation (with respect to least-squares minimization) that will align a set of points with a corresponding set of points. It is used, among other applications, to compare the structures of molecules.

Signal processing
The SVD and pseudoinverse have been successfully applied to signal processing, image processing and big data (e.g., in genomic signal processing).

Other examples
The SVD is also applied extensively to the study of linear inverse problems and is useful in the analysis of regularization methods such as that of Tikhonov. It is widely used in statistics, where it is related to principal component analysis and to correspondence analysis, and in signal processing and pattern recognition. It is also used in output-only modal analysis, where the non-scaled mode shapes can be determined from the singular vectors. Yet another usage is latent semantic indexing in natural-language text processing.

In general numerical computation involving linear or linearized systems, there is a universal constant that characterizes the regularity or singularity of a problem, which is the system's "condition number" . It often controls the error rate or convergence rate of a given computational scheme on such systems.

The SVD also plays a crucial role in the field of quantum information, in a form often referred to as the Schmidt decomposition. Through it, states of two quantum systems are naturally decomposed, providing a necessary and sufficient condition for them to be entangled: if the rank of the  matrix is larger than one.

One application of SVD to rather large matrices is in numerical weather prediction, where Lanczos methods are used to estimate the most linearly quickly growing few perturbations to the central numerical weather prediction over a given initial forward time period; i.e., the singular vectors corresponding to the largest singular values of the linearized propagator for the global weather over that time interval. The output singular vectors in this case are entire weather systems. These perturbations are then run through the full nonlinear model to generate an ensemble forecast, giving a handle on some of the uncertainty that should be allowed for around the current central prediction.

SVD has also been applied to reduced order modelling. The aim of reduced order modelling is to reduce the number of degrees of freedom in a complex system which is to be modeled. SVD was coupled with radial basis functions to interpolate solutions to three-dimensional unsteady flow problems.

Interestingly, SVD has been used to improve gravitational waveform modeling by the ground-based gravitational-wave interferometer aLIGO. SVD can help to increase the accuracy and speed of waveform generation to support gravitational-waves searches and update two different waveform models.

Singular value decomposition is used in recommender systems to predict people's item ratings. Distributed algorithms have been developed for the purpose of calculating the SVD on clusters of commodity machines.

Low-rank SVD has been applied for hotspot detection from spatiotemporal data with application to disease outbreak detection. A combination of SVD and higher-order SVD also has been applied for real time event detection from complex data streams (multivariate data with space and time dimensions) in disease surveillance.

Proof of existence 
An eigenvalue  of a matrix  is characterized by the algebraic relation . When  is Hermitian, a variational characterization is also available. Let  be a real  symmetric matrix. Define

By the extreme value theorem, this continuous function attains a maximum at some u when restricted to the unit sphere {||x|| = 1}. By the Lagrange multipliers theorem, u necessarily satisfies

for some real number . The nabla symbol, is the del operator (differentiation with respect to x). Using the symmetry of  we obtain 

The same calculation performed on the orthogonal complement of u gives the next largest eigenvalue and so on. The complex Hermitian case is similar; there  is a real-valued function of  real variables.

Singular values are similar in that they can be described algebraically or from variational principles.

This section gives these two arguments for existence of singular value decomposition.

Based on the spectral theorem 
Let  be an  complex matrix. Since  is positive semi-definite and Hermitian, by the spectral theorem, there exists an  unitary matrix  such that

 

 

This implies that

 

Moreover, the second equation implies .

 

where the subscripts on the identity matrices are used to remark that they are of different dimensions.

Let us now define

 

Then,

 

since  This can be also seen as immediate consequence of the fact that .

Also, since

 

This means that we can choose  such that  is unitary.

For  we already have  to make it unitary. Now, define

 

Then

 

which is the desired result:

 

Based on variational characterization 

Let  denote an  matrix with real entries.

Since  is the largest value of  it must be non-negative. If it were negative, changing the sign of either  or  would make it positive and therefore larger.

Proof. Similar to the eigenvalues case, by assumption the two vectors satisfy the Lagrange multiplier equation:

After some algebra, this becomes

Plugging this into the pair of equations above, we have

This proves the statement.

The passage from real to complex is similar to the eigenvalue case.

Calculating the SVD 

The singular value decomposition can be computed using the following observations:

Numerical approach 
The SVD of a matrix  is typically computed by a two-step procedure. In the first step, the matrix is reduced to a bidiagonal matrix. This takes O(mn2) floating-point operations (flop), assuming that m ≥ n. The second step is to compute the SVD of the bidiagonal matrix. This step can only be done with an iterative method (as with eigenvalue algorithms). However, in practice it suffices to compute the SVD up to a certain precision, like the machine epsilon. If this precision is considered constant, then the second step takes O(n) iterations, each costing O(n) flops. Thus, the first step is more expensive, and the overall cost is O(mn2) flops .

The first step can be done using Householder reflections for a cost of 4mn2 − 4n3/3 flops, assuming that only the singular values are needed and not the singular vectors. If m is much larger than n then it is advantageous to first reduce the matrix  to a triangular matrix with the QR decomposition and then use Householder reflections to further reduce the matrix to bidiagonal form; the combined cost is 2mn2 + 2n3 flops .

The LAPACK subroutine DBDSQR implements this iterative method, with some modifications to cover the case where the singular values are very small . Together with a first step using Householder reflections and, if appropriate, QR decomposition, this forms the DGESVD routine for the computation of the singular value decomposition.

The same algorithm is implemented in the GNU Scientific Library (GSL). The GSL also offers an alternative method that uses a one-sided Jacobi orthogonalization in step 2 . This method computes the SVD of the bidiagonal matrix by solving a sequence of 2 × 2 SVD problems, similar to how the Jacobi eigenvalue algorithm solves a sequence of 2 × 2 eigenvalue methods . Yet another method for step 2 uses the idea of divide-and-conquer eigenvalue algorithms .

There is an alternative way that does not explicitly use the eigenvalue decomposition.

The approaches that use eigenvalue decompositions are based on the QR algorithm, which is well-developed to be stable and fast. 
Note that the singular values are real and right- and left- singular vectors are not required to form similarity transformations. One can iteratively alternate between the QR decomposition and the LQ decomposition to find the real diagonal Hermitian matrices. The QR decomposition gives  and the LQ decomposition of  gives . Thus, at every iteration, we have , update  and repeat the orthogonalizations. Eventually, this iteration between QR decomposition and LQ decomposition produces left- and right- unitary singular matrices. This approach cannot readily be accelerated, as the QR algorithm can with spectral shifts or deflation. This is because the shift method is not easily defined without using similarity transformations.  However, this iterative approach is very simple to implement, so is a good choice when speed does not matter. This method also provides insight into how purely orthogonal/unitary transformations can obtain the SVD.

Analytic result of 2 × 2 SVD 
The singular values of a 2 × 2 matrix can be found analytically. Let the matrix be

where  are complex numbers that parameterize the matrix,  is the identity matrix, and  denote the Pauli matrices. Then its two singular values are given by

Reduced SVDs

In applications it is quite unusual for the full SVD, including a full unitary decomposition of the null-space of the matrix, to be required.  Instead, it is often sufficient (as well as faster, and more economical for storage) to compute a reduced version of the SVD.  The following can be distinguished for an m×n matrix M of rank r:

Thin SVD
The thin, or economy-sized, SVD of a matrix M is given by

where

,

the matrices Uk and Vk contain only the first k columns of U and V, and Σk contains only the first k singular values from Σ. The matrix Uk is thus m×k, Σk is k×k diagonal, and Vk* is k×n.

The thin SVD uses significantly less space and computation time if k ≪ max(m, n). The first stage in its calculation will usually be a QR decomposition of M, which can make for a significantly quicker calculation in this case.

Compact SVD

Only the r column vectors of U and r row vectors of V* corresponding to the non-zero singular values Σr are calculated. The remaining vectors of U and V* are not calculated. This is quicker and more economical than the thin SVD if r ≪ min(m, n). The matrix Ur is thus m×r, Σr is r×r diagonal, and Vr* is r×n.

Truncated SVD
In many applications the number r of the non-zero singular values is large making even the Compact SVD impractical to compute. In such cases, the smallest singular values may need to be truncated to compute only t ≪ r non-zero singular values. The truncated SVD is no longer an exact decomposition of the original matrix M, but rather provides the optimal low-rank matrix approximation  by any matrix of a fixed rank t

,

where matrix Ut is m×t, Σt is t×t diagonal, and Vt* is t×n.
Only the t column vectors of U and t row vectors of V* corresponding to the t largest singular values Σt are calculated. This can be much quicker and more economical than the compact SVD if t≪r, but requires a completely different toolset of numerical solvers. 

In applications that require an approximation to the Moore–Penrose inverse of the matrix M, the smallest singular values of M are of interest, which are more challenging to compute compared to the largest ones.

Truncated SVD is employed in latent semantic indexing.

Norms

Ky Fan norms 
The sum of the k largest singular values of M is a matrix norm, the Ky Fan k-norm of M.

The first of the Ky Fan norms, the Ky Fan 1-norm, is the same as the operator norm of M as a linear operator with respect to the Euclidean norms of Km and Kn. In other words, the Ky Fan 1-norm is the operator norm induced by the standard ℓ2 Euclidean inner product. For this reason, it is also called the operator 2-norm. One can easily verify the relationship between the Ky Fan 1-norm and singular values. It is true in general, for a bounded operator M on (possibly infinite-dimensional) Hilbert spaces

But, in the matrix case, (M* M)1/2 is a normal matrix, so ||M* M||1/2 is the largest eigenvalue of (M* M)1/2, i.e. the largest singular value of M.

The last of the Ky Fan norms, the sum of all singular values, is the trace norm (also known as the 'nuclear norm'), defined by ||M|| = Tr[(M* M)1/2] (the eigenvalues of M* M are the squares of the singular values).

Hilbert–Schmidt norm 
The singular values are related to another norm on the space of operators. Consider the Hilbert–Schmidt inner product on the  matrices, defined by

So the induced norm is

Since the trace is invariant under unitary equivalence, this shows

Direct calculation shows that the Frobenius norm of  coincides with:

In addition, the Frobenius norm and the trace norm (the nuclear norm) are special cases of the Schatten norm.

Variations and generalizations

Mode-k representation 

Tensor SVD 
Two types of tensor decompositions exist, which generalise the SVD to multi-way arrays. One of them decomposes a tensor into a sum of rank-1 tensors, which is called a tensor rank decomposition. The second type of decomposition computes the orthonormal subspaces associated with the different factors appearing in the tensor product of vector spaces in which the tensor lives. This decomposition is referred to in the literature as the higher-order SVD (HOSVD) or Tucker3/TuckerM. In addition, multilinear principal component analysis in multilinear subspace learning involves the same mathematical operations as Tucker decomposition, being used in a different context of dimensionality reduction.

Scale-invariant SVD 

The singular values of a matrix A are uniquely defined and are invariant with respect to left and/or right unitary transformations of  A. In other words, the singular values of UAV, for unitary U and V, are equal to the singular values of A. This is an important property for applications in which it is necessary to preserve Euclidean distances and invariance with respect to rotations.

The Scale-Invariant SVD, or SI-SVD, is analogous to the conventional SVD except that its uniquely-determined singular values are invariant with respect to diagonal transformations of A. In other words, the singular values of DAE, for invertible diagonal matrices D and E, are equal to the singular values of A. This is an important property for applications for which invariance to the choice of units on variables (e.g., metric versus imperial units) is needed.

Higher-order SVD of functions (HOSVD) 

Tensor product (TP) model transformation numerically reconstruct the HOSVD of functions. For further details please visit:

 Tensor product model transformation
 HOSVD-based canonical form of TP functions and qLPV models
 TP model transformation in control theory

Bounded operators on Hilbert spaces 
The factorization  can be extended to a bounded operator M on a separable Hilbert space H. Namely, for any bounded operator M, there exist a partial isometry U, a unitary V, a measure space (X, μ), and a non-negative measurable f such that

where  is the multiplication by f on L2(X, μ).

This can be shown by mimicking the linear algebraic argument for the matricial case above. VTfV* is the unique positive square root of M*M, as given by the Borel functional calculus for self-adjoint operators. The reason why U need not be unitary is because, unlike the finite-dimensional case, given an isometry U1 with nontrivial kernel, a suitable U2 may not be found such that

is a unitary operator.

As for matrices, the singular value factorization is equivalent to the polar decomposition for operators: we can simply write

and notice that U V* is still a partial isometry while VTfV* is positive.

Singular values and compact operators 
The notion of singular values and left/right-singular vectors can be extended to compact operator on Hilbert space as they have a discrete spectrum. If  is compact, every non-zero  in its spectrum is an eigenvalue. Furthermore, a compact self-adjoint operator can be diagonalized by its eigenvectors. Applying the diagonalization result, the unitary image of its positive square root  has a set of orthonormal eigenvectors  corresponding to strictly positive eigenvalues . For any ,

 

Compact operators on a Hilbert space are the closure of finite-rank operators in the uniform operator topology. The above series expression gives an explicit such representation. An immediate consequence of this is:

Theorem.  is compact if and only if  is compact.

History
The singular value decomposition was originally developed by differential geometers, who wished to determine whether a real bilinear form could be made equal to another by independent orthogonal transformations of the two spaces it acts on. Eugenio Beltrami and Camille Jordan discovered independently, in 1873 and 1874 respectively, that the singular values of the bilinear forms, represented as a matrix, form a complete set of invariants for bilinear forms under orthogonal substitutions. James Joseph Sylvester also arrived at the singular value decomposition for real square matrices in 1889, apparently independently of both Beltrami and Jordan. Sylvester called the singular values the canonical multipliers of the matrix A. The fourth mathematician to discover the singular value decomposition independently is Autonne in 1915, who arrived at it via the polar decomposition. The first proof of the singular value decomposition for rectangular and complex matrices seems to be by Carl Eckart and Gale J. Young in 1936; they saw it as a generalization of the principal axis transformation for Hermitian matrices.

In 1907, Erhard Schmidt defined an analog of singular values for integral operators (which are compact, under some weak technical assumptions); it seems he was unaware of the parallel work on singular values of finite matrices. This theory was further developed by Émile Picard in 1910, who is the first to call the numbers  singular values (or in French, valeurs singulières).

Practical methods for computing the SVD date back to Kogbetliantz in 1954–1955 and Hestenes in 1958, resembling closely the Jacobi eigenvalue algorithm, which uses plane rotations or Givens rotations. However, these were replaced by the method of Gene Golub and William Kahan published in 1965, which uses Householder transformations or reflections. In 1970, Golub and Christian Reinsch published a variant of the Golub/Kahan algorithm that is still the one most-used today.

See also

Notes

References
 
 
 
 
 
 
 
 Halldor, Bjornsson and Venegas, Silvia A. (1997). "A manual for EOF and SVD analyses of climate data". McGill University, CCGCR Report No. 97-1, Montréal, Québec, 52pp.

External links 
 Online SVD calculator

 
Linear algebra
Numerical linear algebra
Matrix theory
Matrix decompositions
Functional analysis